Kenneth Ray Tatum (born April 25, 1944) is an American retired professional baseball player. A right-handed relief pitcher, he appeared in 176 games pitched (all but two in a bullpen role) over six seasons (1969–74) for the California Angels, Boston Red Sox and Chicago White Sox of Major League Baseball. The native of Alexandria, Louisiana, attended Mississippi State University.

Playing career

Stellar MLB debut
Tatum's professional career began when he signed with the Angels in 1966 after he was selected in the second round of the secondary phase of the 1966 Major League Baseball Draft. He quickly established himself as the team's top short reliever—the term "closer" was not then in use. By the end of July, he had amassed seven saves and three wins in relief, with an earned run average of 0.95 in 21 games. He finished the year with a win–loss record of 7–2, 22 saves, and an earned run average of 1.36 in 45 games pitched. He placed fourth in American League Rookie of the Year balloting.

Tatum began  with another skein of excellent relief pitching. During the season's first two months, he appeared in 20 games, won two of three decisions, netted eight saves, and posted a 1.00 ERA in 27 innings pitched. But in the eighth inning of his 20th appearance on May 31, while he was in the process of notching a four-inning save in a 6–1 victory over the Baltimore Orioles at Anaheim Stadium, Tatum threw a pitch that hit the Orioles' Paul Blair in the face. Blair sustained a broken nose, orbital floor fractures below his left eye and a broken cheekbone, and he missed three weeks of action; his vision, however, was not affected. He remained the Orioles' regular center fielder through  and retired from the Majors during the  campaign. The beaning was unintentional, as Tatum had grazed the jersey front of the previous batter Boog Powell.

Decline after Blair beanball
But the incident may have been a turning point that ruined Tatum's career. Affected by Blair's traumatic injury, he became reluctant to pitch inside. By August 1, his earned run average had risen by two full points to 3.00 and it would climb as high as 3.30 on August 30 before he was able to string together enough effective appearances to lower it to 2.94 at season's end. For the year, he went 7–4 with 17 saves in 62 games. Wrote Peter Gammons in 2013: "After [Tatum] retired, he admitted he pitched with the fear 'that I might kill someone. I could never pitch on the inside half of the plate again.'"

Ten days after the 1970 season ended, the Angels traded Tatum to the Red Sox in a six-player swap that brought slugger Tony Conigliaro to Anaheim. (Ironically, Conigliaro's career was curtailed by the after-effects of a beanball in a game between the Red Sox and Angels on August 18, 1967.) But Tatum was ineffective in Boston. In his first game, on April 8, 1971, he blew a 2–1 ninth-inning lead for Sonny Siebert and lost to the Cleveland Indians on a walk-off single to Gomer Hodge. Tatum recovered to pitch well over his next 16 games, but on May 23, he was injured by a line drive to the face during batting practice. Coincidentally, he fractured his cheekbone, and the injury occurred in Baltimore, with Blair still an Oriole stalwart. Tatum would miss a full month of action, and his pitching suffered. He ended the season having worked in only 36 games, with a 2–4 record, 4.09 earned run average and only nine saves.

He was dealt along with Reggie Smith from the Red Sox to the St. Louis Cardinals for Bernie Carbo and Rick Wise on October 26, 1973. He retired at the close of that season.

All told, Tatum compiled a 16–12 record in the big leagues with 52 saves and a career ERA of 2.93. He allowed 230 hits and 117 bases on balls in 282 innings pitched, with 156 strikeouts.

References

External links

1944 births
Living people
Baseball players from Louisiana
Boston Red Sox players
California Angels players
Chicago White Sox players
El Paso Sun Kings players
Hawaii Islanders players
Iowa Oaks players
Major League Baseball pitchers
Mississippi State Bulldogs baseball players
Pawtucket Red Sox players
Quad Cities Angels players
San Jose Bees players
Sportspeople from Alexandria, Louisiana